Wolastoqiyik Lintuwakonawa is the debut album by Canadian composer and tenor Jeremy Dutcher, released in 2018. The album, featuring post-classical rearrangement of traditional First Nations music, was the winner of the 2018 Polaris Music Prize.

Background
Dutcher began his academic studies at Dalhousie University studying music but shifted his focus to anthropological research on his Wolastoq community where he grew up.

Guided by the suggestion on a Wolastoqiyik elder, teacher, and song carrier named Maggie Paul he began to study traditional songs which eventually led the classically-trained opera singer to start a research project at the Canadian Museum of History. There he explored an extensive collection of documents, photographs and recordings made by anthropologist William Mechling between 1907 and 1914 when he spent time in indigenous communities documenting the languages and cultures under the assumption they were soon to disappear.

Among the documents, Dutcher focused on transcribing a collection of wax cylinder recordings of Wolastoqiyik people singing their traditional songs.

Originally, Dutcher says he didn't envision the transcriptions being part of an album, but as he spent more time with them at home he began to consider ways to incorporate his musical interests with his historical preservation efforts. He eventually obtained digital copies of the wax cylinder recordings that he listened to on his headphones while riding public transit in Toronto and at home in the dark.

With very little representation of indigenous peoples or cultures in the traditional classical music canon, Dutcher wanted to expose his heritage to the genre, but more importantly to him, he wanted to produce an album which brought the endangered language to new generations of Wolastoqiyik people.

Some of the original wax cylinder recordings are sampled throughout the album.

The lead single, "Mehcinut" features Dutcher singing in his ancestral language before Jim Pauli, a voice from the archival recordings, emerges in the middle of the song to perform with him as the track builds to its crescendo.

Paul's voice is heard on the album track "Eqpahak", stating "when you bring the songs back, you're going to bring the people back, you're going to bring everything back."

The album's cultural context is also reflected in its cover art, which recreates a period scene of an anthropologist recording the songs; on the front cover, Dutcher is depicted sitting in the position of the singer being recorded, while on the back cover he is depicted sitting in the position of the anthropologist.

Promotion 
The album was premiered on the Billboard website on April 5, 2018. Dutcher explained during an interview with the magazine that he wanted to counter the "bilingual Anglo-centric Canadian music narrative". The album was fully released on April 6, 2018. Exclaim! rated the album a 9 out of 10.

Track listing 
All tracks written and produced by Jeremy Dutcher and BUFFLO.

Personnel

Musicians 
 Jeremy Dutcher – piano and voice
 Devon Bate – electronics
 Teiya Kasahara – soprano
 Ian Gibbons – cello
 Justin Wright – cello
 Kate Maloney – violin
 Taylor Miltz – violin
 Lucas Blekeberg – viola
 Alex K.S. – double bass 
 Sierra Noble – fiddle
 Brandon Valdivia – percussion
 BUFFLO & Jeremy Dutcher – producer
 Pascal Shefteshy – mixing
 Jonathan Kaspy – mastering

Album artwork 
 Kent Monkman and Jeremy Dutcher
 Matt Barnes – photography
 Monique Aura Bedard – ancestral images
 Chris Hadzipetros – layout

Charts

Awards and nominations 
The album was named the winner of the 2018 Polaris Music Prize, and for the Juno Award for Indigenous Music Album of the Year.

References

2018 debut albums
Jeremy Dutcher albums
Polaris Music Prize-winning albums
Juno Award for Indigenous Music Album of the Year albums